Rollet Island is a small island 1 nautical mile (1.9 km) north of the northwest part of Booth Island in the Dannebrog Islands. Discovered by the French Antarctic Expedition, 1903–05, under J.B. Charcot, who named it "Ile Rollet de l'Isle" for Monsieur Rollet de l'Isle, French hydrographic surveyor. A shortened form of the original name has been adopted.

See also 
 List of Antarctic and sub-Antarctic islands
 

Islands of Graham Land
Graham Coast